The year 2002 was the 31st year after the independence of Bangladesh, and the second year of the third term of the government of Khaleda Zia.

Incumbents

 President:
 until 21 June: Badruddoza Chowdhury
 21 June – 6 September: Muhammad Jamiruddin Sircar (acting)
 starting 6 September: Iajuddin Ahmed
 Prime Minister: Khaleda Zia
 Chief Justice: Mahmudul Amin Choudhury (until 17 June), Mainur Reza Choudhury (starting 18 June)

Demography

Climate

Flood
In late summer 2002, heavy monsoon rains led to massive flooding in eastern India, Nepal, and Bangladesh, killing over 500 people and leaving millions homeless. There were an estimated 3.5 million victims of flooding in 30 out of 64 districts. Continuous heavy rainfall and water from the Meghalay hills in India had caused the flash floods.

Economy

Note: For the year 2002 average official exchange rate for BDT was 57.89 per US$.

Events
 1 January – The government of Bangladesh banned the sale of polyethylene bags in the capital, Dhaka, for environmental reason.
 5 February – The government of Bangladesh introduce a maximum sentence of death for acid attacks.
 3 May - A ferry named MV Salahuddin-2 sank in the Meghna River south of Dhaka, Bangladesh, leading to death of more than 450 people.
 23 July – Bangladesh Police raid Shamsunnahar Hall, the women's dorm, of University of Dhaka.
 29 August – According to the annual survey by Transparency International, Bangladesh is amongst the most corrupt nations, along with Indonesia, and neighbours India and Pakistan.
 16 October - An anti crime operation named "Operation Clean Heart" carried out by Bangladesh Army, Bangladesh Navy, Bangladesh Rifles, Bangladesh Police and Bangladesh Ansar members in Bangladesh started.
 10 November - Model Tinni was murdered.
 1 December – 30 people die in Gaibandha in a stampede when a mill owner opened the gates of his house to distribute food to the poor.
 6 December - Coordinated bombing of four movie theaters caused in the deaths of 27 people and injured over 200 others in Mymensingh, Bangladesh.

Awards and Recognitions

Independence Day Award

Ekushey Padak
 Sufia Ahmed, flourishing culture and Language Movement
 Gazi Mazharul Anwar, music
 Abul Kalam Azad, education (posthumously) 
 Abdul Hamid Khan Bhashani, Language Movement (posthumously)
 Ahmed Sofa, literature (posthumously)
 Monzur Hossain, Language Movement (posthumously)
 Sharif Hossain, education
 Serajur Rahman, journalism
 Abdur Jabbar Khan, film (posthumously)
 Sadek Khan, Language Movement and film
 Kazi Golam Mahbub, Language Movement
 Pratibha Mutsuddi, education
 Muhammad Shahidullah, literature and Language Movement (posthumously)
 Ramesh Shil, Gano Sangeet (posthumously)

Sports
 Asian Games:
 Bangladesh participated in  the 2002 Asian Games held in Busan, South Korea. Bangladesh national kabaddi team won silver medal in kabaddi.
 Commonwealth Games:
 Bangladesh participated in  the 2002 Commonwealth Games held in Manchester, England. Shooter Asif Hossain Khan won gold in 10 m Air rifle individual event.
 Domestic football:
 Mohammedan SC won Dhaka League title while Abahani KC became runner-up.
 Cricket:
 The Pakistani national cricket team toured Bangladesh in January 2002 and played a two-match Test series against the Bangladeshi national cricket team. Pakistan won the Test series 2–0. In addition, the teams played a three-match series of Limited Overs Internationals (LOI) which Pakistan won 3–0.
 In August Bangladesh toured Sri Lanka and played 3 ODIs and 2 test matches. This was followed by 2002 ICC Champions Trophy in which Bangladesh played 2 ODIs against Australia and New Zealand. Bangladesh lost all these matches.
 In October Bangladesh toured South Africa for another bi-lateral series of 3 ODIs and 2 test matches. Bangladesh could not win any of these matches either.
 Later in December the West Indies team visited Bangladesh and played two Test matches and three limited overs internationals. They won both the Test matches and two of the One Day Internationals, while the remaining ODI was a no result.
 Chess:
 Grandmaster Ziaur Rahman earned his GM title

Deaths
 17 February – Ehtesham, film director (b. 1927)
 18 June – Nilima Ibrahim, academician, author (b. 1921)
 28 July – Syed Ali Ahsan, poet (b. 1920)
 13 October – Ila Mitra, peasant movement organizer (b. 1925)

See also 
 2000s in Bangladesh
 List of Bangladeshi films of 2002
 Timeline of Bangladeshi history

References

 
Bangladesh
Bangladesh